Prince Albert Northcote is a provincial electoral district for the Legislative Assembly of Saskatchewan, Canada.

One of two provincial constituencies for the city of Prince Albert, the other being Prince Albert Carlton, the riding's southern boundary follows 15th Street (Hwy. 302) from east to west; then curves south along 9th/10th Avenue West to 28th Street, which the boundary follows westward until the city limits.

The riding was created in 1991 out of parts of Prince Albert, Prince Albert-Duck Lake and Shellbrook-Torch River. It was last contested in the 2020 general election, when Saskatchewan Party candidate Alana Ross defeated incumbent NDP MLA Nicole Rancourt.

History 
Since it was first contested in the 1991 general election, Prince Albert Northcote has returned New Democrat MLAs, with the exception of Victoria Jurgens of the Saskatchewan Party in the 2011 election. The NDP retook the riding in the 2016 general election.

Members of the Legislative Assembly

Election results

2020 Saskatchewan general election

2016 Saskatchewan general election

2011 Saskatchewan general election

2007 Saskatchewan general election

2003 Saskatchewan general election

1999 Saskatchewan general election

1995 Saskatchewan general election

1991 Saskatchewan general election

References

External links 
Website of the Legislative Assembly of Saskatchewan
Elections Saskatchewan - Official Results of the 2011 Provincial Election
Saskatchewan Archives Board – Saskatchewan Election Results By Electoral Division
Map of Prince Albert Northcote riding as of 2016

Politics of Prince Albert, Saskatchewan
Saskatchewan provincial electoral districts